Kürtün is a town and district of Gümüşhane Province in the Black Sea region of Turkey. According to the 2000 census, population of the district is 15,546 of which 3,488 live in the town of Kürtün.

Notes

References

External links
 District governor's official website 
 Road map of Kürtün and environs

Kurtun
Districts of Gümüşhane Province